Razmeđa is a Croatian film directed by Krešo Golik. It was released in 1973.

External links
 

1973 films
Croatian-language films
Yugoslav drama films
Films directed by Krešo Golik
Croatian black-and-white films